Cumayanı Cave is a cave located in Çatalağzı town of Zonguldak Province, northern Turkey.

References

Caves of Turkey
Caves of Zonguldak Province
Tourist attractions in Zonguldak Province